Denisse Fajardo García (born July 1, 1964 in Lima) is a retired Peruvian volleyball player, and a three-time Olympian for her native country. She won the silver medal at the 1988 Olympic Games in Seoul, after playing the Soviet Union in the final. She also competed at the 1984 Olympic Games in Los Angeles, where Peru reached the semi finals and lost to the United States, and finally finished in fourth place. She was a member of the Peruvian team that won second place in the World Championship in 1982.

Career
Fajardo won the 1995 South American Club Championship gold medal playing with the Peruvian club Juventus Sipesa.

References

External links
 
 

1964 births
Living people
Peruvian women's volleyball players
Olympic volleyball players of Peru
Volleyball players at the 1980 Summer Olympics
Volleyball players at the 1984 Summer Olympics
Volleyball players at the 1988 Summer Olympics
Olympic silver medalists for Peru
Sportspeople from Lima
Olympic medalists in volleyball
Medalists at the 1988 Summer Olympics
Pan American Games medalists in volleyball
Pan American Games silver medalists for Peru
Pan American Games bronze medalists for Peru
Volleyball players at the 1983 Pan American Games
Volleyball players at the 1987 Pan American Games
Volleyball players at the 1991 Pan American Games
Medalists at the 1983 Pan American Games
Medalists at the 1987 Pan American Games
Medalists at the 1991 Pan American Games
20th-century Peruvian women